Gisele Miró (born November 1, 1968) is a former tennis player from Brazil.

Miró competed for her native country at the 1988 Summer Olympics in Seoul. She won two singles and one doubles titles in the ITF Women's Circuit, and reached her highest individual ranking on the WTA Tour on April 25, 1988, when she became the No. 99 of the world.

ITF finals

Singles (2–0)

Doubles (1–2)

References

External links
 
 

1968 births
Sportspeople from Curitiba
Living people
Brazilian female tennis players
Brazilian people of Spanish descent
Olympic tennis players of Brazil
Tennis players at the 1987 Pan American Games
Tennis players at the 1988 Summer Olympics
Pan American Games gold medalists for Brazil
Pan American Games medalists in tennis
Medalists at the 1987 Pan American Games
20th-century Brazilian women
21st-century Brazilian women